The Korean Basketball League Rookie of the Year Award (Korean: 신인선수상) is an annual Korean Basketball League (KBL) award given since 1998 to the best performing rookie player. Both foreign and domestic players who meet the criteria are eligible to be nominated for the award.

Eligibility
Domestic players must be in their first two seasons and have played at least 50% of the 54 league games. Foreign players with experience in overseas leagues may be considered for nomination but must have less than a year of playing experience in a professional team.

History
From the 1997–98 season to the 2011–12 seasons, the KBL rookie draft took place in January or February, towards the end of the season. Rookies only began their first season with a professional team in October of the same calendar year, when the KBL season began. The draft was eventually moved closer to the beginning of the professional season.

In terms of award eligibility, the term "rookie" (Korean: 신인) previously only applied to players in their first year as a professional. With the rise of foreign import players and increasing competition among domestic players for spots on the first team, concerns arose over the fact that few first-year players clocked up enough playing time to qualify for the award and players who were only able to break into the first team during their second or third year as a professional. Prior to the 2020–21 season, the KBL announced that eligibility for the award would be extended to players in their first two years and foreign players.

Winners

Teams

Of the ten KBL teams, Suwon KT Sonicboom and its predecessors is the only team who has not produced a Rookie of the Year Award winner.

Notes

References

External links
Records: Past records / 주요기록: 역대수상현황 on the Korean Basketball League official website 

Awards established in 1998
Rookie player awards
Korean Basketball League awards